The Sepang District is a district located in the southern part of the state of Selangor in Malaysia. Sepang District covers an area of around 600 square kilometres, and had a population of 190,889 in the 2010 Census (excluding foreigners).

The district of Sepang is also famous for the township of Cyberjaya, which is also known as the Silicon Valley of Malaysia vis-à-vis its association with the MSC Malaysia. The capital of Sepang district is Salak Tinggi, which took over from Sepang town.

The remaining areas of Puchong, such as Bukit Puchong 2, 16 Sierra, Pulau Meranti, Bandar Nusaputra, Taman Putra Perdana, Taman Putra Prima, Taman Meranti Jaya and Taman Mas, are located in this district.

History
Sepang district was formed from parts of the adjacent constituencies of Hulu Langat (Kajang) and Kuala Langat on 1 January 1975; though there was already a Sepang constituency in parliament as early as 1959. Sepang gained municipal status in 2005.

Geography
Sepang district is situated in the southern part of Selangor. It shares its border with Kuala Langat to the west, Petaling to the north, Hulu Langat to the northeast and the state of Negeri Sembilan to the east. Sepang also completely surrounds Putrajaya which is a Federal Territory.

Administrative divisions

Sepang District is divided into three mukims:
 Dengkil
 
 Sepang

Demographics

Federal Parliament and State Assembly seats

List of Sepang district representatives in the Federal Parliament (Dewan Rakyat)

List of Sepang district representatives in the State Legislative Assembly (Dewan Undangan Negeri)

Economy
Malaysia Airlines, a Malaysian national carrier; AirAsia, a Malaysian low-cost carrier; AirAsia X, a subsidiary of AirAsia; MASkargo, a cargo airline; and Malaysia Airports, the Malaysian Airport authority; are headquartered on the property of Kuala Lumpur International Airport in Sepang. Malaysia Airlines also operates its Flight Management Building at Kuala Lumpur International Airport.

Animonsta Studios has its headquarters in Cyberjaya.

Tourist attractions
 Sepang International Circuit
 Bagan Lalang Beach
 Avani Sepang Gold Coast
 Mitsui Outlet Park KLIA
 IOI City Mall

Transportation

Air
The district houses the Kuala Lumpur International Airport.

Rail

In addition, three MRT Putrajaya line stations (which is opening on 16 March 2023) are also located inside the district:  16 Sierra station (serving 16 Sierra & Pulau Meranti),  Cyberjaya Utara station and  Cyberjaya City Centre station (both stations serve Cyberjaya).

Bus
The most dominant bus operator for this district is Smart Selangor, operated by Handal Ceria and SKS-BUS. These free buses connect the main bus hub located in Taman Seroja, Bandar Baru Salak Tinggi to the areas in Sepang district such as Kuala Lumpur International Airport,  Salak Tinggi ERL station, Cyberjaya, Sungai Merab and IOI City Mall, as well from Tanjung Sepat to KLIA.

Other bus operators also serve areas in Sepang district. Causeway Link bus route 601 connects Kuala Lumpur to Taman Putra Perdana in Sepang district, while KR Travel & Tours bus route  connects  Putrajaya Sentral,  KTM Serdang or Kuala Lumpur to IOI City Mall – the largest mall in Malaysia & Southeast Asia. Rapid KL, the dominant bus operator in Klang Valley only operates one route in Sepang district which is bus route T603 from  Puchong Prima LRT station to Taman Mas Sepang, while the upcoming MRT Putrajaya line feeder bus routes T504, T505, T506 and T507 serving Cyberjaya will begin operation on 16 March 2023.

Education

Tertiary 
Sepang is home to several institutions of higher learning, which includes:
 Xiamen University Malaysia
 Multimedia University Cyberjaya Campus
 University of Cyberjaya
 Universiti Islam Malaysia
 Limkokwing University of Creative Technology

See also
 Districts of Malaysia

References

External links

 
 Sepang International Circuit
 Kuala Lumpur International Airport
 KLIA Express Rail